Uglier Than They Used ta Be is the fourth album by the American rock band Ugly Kid Joe, released in Europe on September 18, 2015, and in North America on October 16. 

On February 4, 2015, Ugly Kid Joe started a crowdfunding effort through PledgeMusic.com to fund their new album called, Uglier Than They Used ta Be. The album was completely funded by February 20. Uglier Than They Used ta Be is the first full-length studio album in nearly 19 years.

Critical reception
Calling the band "a scourge but now a saviour of heavy rock," before Chris Ayers of Exclaim! wrote that "Ugly Kid Joe prove that their catchy hooks and solid vocals are cool to like again on Uglier Than They Used Ta Be."

Track listing
 "Hell Ain't Hard to Find" – 3:48
 "Let the Record Play" – 3:50
 "Bad Seed" – 5:00
 "Mirror of the Man" – 3:55
 "She's Already Gone" – 4:21
 "Nothing Ever Changes" – 3:23
 "My Old Man" – 3:41
 "Under the Bottom" – 5:47
 "Ace of Spades" (Motörhead cover) – 2:44
 "The Enemy" – 6:06
 "Papa Was a Rolling Stone" (The Undisputed Truth cover) (feat. Dallas Frasca) – 5:46

Lineup 

 Whitfield Crane – vocals
 Dave Fortman – guitar, producer
 Klaus Eichstadt – guitar
 Cordell Crockett – bass
 Shannon Larkin – drums

Additional personnel:

 Sonny Mayo – additional guitars
 Zac Morris – additional drums
 David Troia - engineer
 Phil Campbell – guest guitar (on "My Old Man", "Under the Bottom", and "Ace of Spades")

Charts

References

2015 albums
Ugly Kid Joe albums
Crowdfunded albums